The Worldwide Texas Tour was a concert tour by American rock band ZZ Top. Arranged in support of their 1975 album Fandango!, the band visited arenas, stadiums, and auditoriums from 1976 to 1977. The elaborate stage production was designed to bring Texas to national audiences, with regional fauna and flora.

Encompassing five legs and 97 shows, the tour began in Winston-Salem, North Carolina on May 29, 1976 and ended in Fort Worth, Texas on December 31, 1977. The band's 1976 album Tejas, which elaborated on the tour's artistic theme, was recorded during a break in the tour, and its songs were played in 1977. In 2008, Guitar World′s Alan di Perna called it "one of the most ambitious and bizarre tours in all of rock history".

Background
ZZ Top's 1973 album Tres Hombres and supporting single "La Grange" brought them commercial and critical success in the United States. They gained a reputation as one of the top rock acts in the country and earned them the nickname "that little ol' band from Texas". On September 1, 1974, ZZ Top performed at Texas Memorial Stadium in Austin. The concert—photographs of which were used for their 1975 Fandango! album—was the last at the stadium until the Eagles performed there in 1995, as the artificial turf was damaged by rowdy fans. In 2008, guitarist and vocalist Billy Gibbons recalled the concert as a "great, great event".

Design and production
The Worldwide Texas Tour stage was designed by Bill Narum, who also designed ZZ Top's album covers and tour posters. Whereas ZZ Top had previously used simple productions, the tour stage was an elaborate setup designed to "bring Texas to the people". It included a 63-by-48 foot (19-by-15 m) stage that was tilted at a four-degree angle, which resembled the shape of Texas and weighed 35 tons (70,000 lbs), costing a reported US$100,000. The stage was constructed in a seven-hour process with the help of 40 crew members. The set's backdrop was a 180-foot (55 m) three-dimensional panorama that used five scrims measuring 36-by-20 feet (11-by-6 m), which were hand-painted and individually lit to show dawn and dusk effects.

The presentation also included live animals such as a longhorn steer, black buffalo, two vultures, and two rattlesnakes, and plants such as yucca, agave, and cacti. Over US$140,000 was spent to ensure that the animals were healthy, traveling under the supervision of an animal expert and veterinarian. The set used 260 speakers and 130 light fixtures, using over 136,000 watts of power. A crew of 50 people traveled in a series of 13 vehicles to transport 75 tons (150,000 lbs) of equipment. The entire production and crew were insured for $10 million.

Planning, itinerary, and ticketing
Rehearsals began in May 1976 at Astroarena in Houston. The band and crew spent a week rehearsing the show, constructing and adjusting the stage set. Unlike many of the group's previous tours, which began around the release of a new album, the Worldwide Texas Tour started over a year after Fandango! was released, allowing fans the opportunity to familiarise themselves with the songs. By opening night, the album had already been certified gold in the United States and sold over one million copies in Canada. The first leg of the tour, 30 shows in the US, alternated between stadiums and arenas. Concerts in Europe, Japan, Australia, and Mexico were cancelled due to quarantine restrictions for buffalo. 

The band's recorded their 1976 album Tejas during a break in the tour, and played its songs in 1977. By the time the third US leg began, Tejas had sold more than half a million copies in the US. The leg, which began in February 1977, was the band's first full arena leg of the tour. Four days of heavy rain and hailstorms preceded the opening show at Groves Stadium, which decreased ticket sales to 20,000. Tickets for two shows at The Summit in Houston sold out in less than twelve hours.  Ticket prices for outdoor venues were US$8.50 in advance and $10 on the day of the show, while indoor venues were $6 in advance and $7 at the door. At its conclusion, the Worldwide Texas Tour sold over 1.2 million tickets. In 2008, Guitar World′s Alan di Perna called it "one of the most ambitious and bizarre tours in all of rock history".

Setlist

Tour dates

Notes

References

ZZ Top concert tours
1976 concert tours
1977 concert tours